Felix James Samuely (3 February 1902 – 22 January 1959) was a Structural engineer.

Born in Vienna, he immigrated to Britain in 1933. Worked with Erich Mendelsohn on the De la Warr Pavilion, Bexhill-on-Sea (1936), the British Pavilion for the Brussels World’s Fair (1958)  and on various parts of the Festival of Britain. Published MARS plan for London with Arthur Korn in 1942. He worked with George Grenfell Baines on a number of projects employing the mullion wall concept.

Samuely died in the London Clinic, 20 Devonshire Place, London, following a heart attack, leaving his wife and his mother, and was cremated at Golders Green crematorium in Middlesex.

Sources

1902 births
1959 deaths
Structural engineers
Austrian emigrants to the United Kingdom